Robert William Smart (born December 20, 1973) is an American artist whose work spans numerous disciplines from social commentary to programmable lighting technologies. Primarily, his work consists of large-scale Public Art installations in metal and glass for various cities and universities. Smart has been working as an independent artist for the last 30 years and attended many national and international artist-in- residence programs. In addition, he taught sculpture and drawing for various colleges and universities.

Early life

Smart was born on December 20, 1973, in Milwaukee, Wisconsin. He is the son of Donald Alvord Smart (1942-2022) and Janette Carol Smart (1943-). Smart received his BA degree at Lawrence University of Appleton, Wisconsin in 1996. He then attended the University of Oregon in Eugene, Oregon and did coursework in architecture, sculpture, and figurative studies.

In 2001, Smart went to the Pilchuck Glass School in Stanwood, Washington to learn glass casting and kiln slumping. He studied with glass artist William Morris at the Pilchuck Glass School.

Career

Massachusetts: 1998-2000

While earning his Masters of Fine Arts in 1999 at  Boston University in Boston, Massachusetts. Smart worked as a teaching assistant from 1998 to 2000. In addition to his graduate course work, he taught welding, figure drawing, and 3D design to undergraduate students. In Cambridge, Massachusetts, he was a studio assistant to sculptor Dimitri Hadzi.

In 1999, he created an exhibition at the Boston Cyberarts Festival, which later became a permanent interactive computer installation entitled Time. This is located within the main lobby at the Boston University Photonics Center. The sculpture uses interactive photonics technologies, programmable LED light, and glass columns. The interactive photonics technology senses light that interacts with what is near the columns containing optical prismatic film. The columns sense variations in proximal light, and through transmission, emission, and modulation are able "to create a kaleidoscope of changing color."

Wisconsin: 2000-2009

In 2000, Smart participated in an artist-in-residence with the John Michael Kohler Arts Center Arts/Industry program in the Kohler Co., a manufacturing company in Kohler, Wisconsin. He spent three months doing foundry work in cast iron, brass, and copper. Robert’s work has become part of the John Michael Kohler Art Center and Museum collection and revolving shows within the Art Preserve of the John Michael Kohler Art Center.

Cellular Automata

In 2003, he worked at the Lawrence University in Appleton, Wisconsin as an assistant professor of sculpture. In 2005, he was commissioned by the University to design and install a sculptural installation in the newly-constructed science building. Here, 21 hexagonal panels (cells) of glass are secured within aluminum and brushed stainless steel frames that contain light-emitting diodes. This work contains multiple analogies to growth structures in nature, and were inspired by micro and macroscopic elements of the natural sciences and mathematics. Floating 3-12 inches from a limestone wall, the composition consists of cell groupings that are both joined and independent. Each panel has been etched with images that glow from both ambient and internal electronic light sources. Each panel is saturated with transitioning colored light emanating from the LEDs capable of presenting 16 million colors. The piece is programmed to respond to the environment, people and their movements, and the time of day. Cellular Automata are discrete dynamical systems whose behavior is completely specified in terms of a local relation. A cellular automaton can be thought of as a stylized universe.

Celtic Knot

In summer of 2005, Smart went to Oregon, Illinois to do a 9-day workshop of art and agriculture with mowed earthen-work on a  plot for the Fields Project Art Festival. He did a "Celtic Knot" mowed canvass on an Oregon farm.

SS Core

In 2007, Smart installed the corten steel public art sculpture entitled SS Core Sphere purchased by the city of Milwaukee, Wisconsin and is located on the Northwest end of downtown plaza Kilbourn Avenue Bridge. Randall A. Goldenin of the Mid life Crisis Crossover said: "I look at it and I see a beryllium sphere from Galaxy Quest." The sphere was created using repurposed end caps of propane tanks.

Fire Station #5

In 2009, Smart was awarded the commission to create Emitting Waves, a public art piece installed at Fire Station #5 in Evanston, Illinois. This sculpture of a continuous wave of water uses computer programmable LED illumination, cell-cast acrylic, glass, and stainless steel panels for the Leadership in Energy and Environmental Design (LEED) certified Fire Station.

Minnesota: 2001-2010

Since 2001 Smart has maintained Smart Design Studios on Nicollet Island in Minneapolis, Minnesota. Through the years he has continued his practice of sculptural fabrication, and lighting design work.

La Souterraine

In 2000, Smart was invited to the small village La Souterraine in central France to work at the Les Recontres Multicultural Arts Festival doing performance/sculpture in live cast mask making. He created plaster casts of sixteen volunteers’ faces and documented the process through recorded interviews and photography. In 2001, he went to an iron casting residency at the Franconia Sculpture Park in Shafer, Minnesota. He worked on the plaster casts made in France and turned them into cast iron through the sand casting process. In 2005, the iron casts were then used as a multi-part installation, entitled “La Souterraine de Couler,” for the Skokie Northshore Sculpture Park in Skokie, Illinois. The cast iron faces were mounted on steel I-beams and anchored to the ground. The park is situated along the North Shore Channel. The first sculptures were built in the park in 1988 and it now has over 70 sculptures. This is an ongoing work that Smart has maintained since 2005.

Core Sphere

In 2001, Smart traveled from Minnesota to Topeka, Kansas to do an installation entitled “Core Sphere” for the Washburn University's Outdoor Sculpture Exhibition.

In 2002, Smart went to Suffolk, England to do a residency for the US/UK International Iron Symposium in Suffolk. He worked with foundry casting of mixed metals. In the same year he went to the Darkened World Exhibition at the Britten-Pears Library, during the Aldeburgh Festival, in Aldeburgh, England to show cast iron and bronze fusion exploring responses to war.

Orphan Musicians

In 2004, Smart was at Fort Collins, Colorado to exhibit 12-foot outdoor recycled steel installations, named Orphan Musicians, at Colorado State University.

Oregon

From 2006 to 2008, Smart worked at the University of Oregon in Eugene, Oregon teaching continuing educational courses in sculpture and welding. In 2006, Smart was a Caldera artist-in-residence for the Caldera AiR Program near Sisters, Oregon. His project was doing installations in light (LEDs) and photography from the Oregon Cascades. That same year he did an exhibition that included installations and set design at the Fever Theater for the Portland Theatre Company for the play Mitlaufer, from collaborations built at the Caldera AiR Program.

Smart won the 2007 Artist Initiative Grant from the Minnesota State Arts Board in Minneapolis. The grant funded a collaborative project with students at the University of Minnesota that involved building a series of internally Illuminated spheres from recycled materials. Each sphere was developed on a theme based on the materials used to construct the surface of the sphere. The completed sculptures were exhibited at the University as well as the corporations that provided the recycled materials.

Wind Smithing Light

In 2009, Smart was the selected artist that was commission by the Northland Community & Technical College in East Grand Forks, Minnesota. In 2011, he installed Wind Smithing Light, a permanent multi-part installation in aluminum, acrylic, and programmable LEDs, (110’ x 20’).

Cellular Photonics: Eastern New Mexico

In 2010, Smart traveled to Santa Fe, New Mexico to build 12 hand-carved cast-acrylic relief panels with images derived from all branches of science, for the Eastern New Mexico University's Science Hall in Portales, New Mexico. The panels are titled Cellular Phonics: Illumifusion, and are steel and glass, programmable with LED light.

Santa Barbara: 2011-2022

In 2011, Smart created a second studio in Santa Barbara, California after the devastation of the Tea Fire. He lives and works in Santa Barbara with his partner and artist Gary Hugh Brown.

Cellular Photonics: Minneapolis

In 2011, Smart constructed a permanent “Cellular Photonics” structure that is a suspended helix structure composed of hexagonal glass panels, stainless steel, and programmable LED illumination, (20’ x 18’ x 18') for the Minneapolis Community and Technical College, (MCTC) Science Building in Minneapolis.

Breathing wall

In 2013, Smart built a 35’ x 10’ x 2’ programmable LED “breathing wall” and seven roll-formed illuminated benches for the Penfield Redevelopment Project, in Saint Paul, Minnesota.

In 2014, Smart was hired to design and build the interior and exterior spaces for Jameson’s Lounge. With a “modern-retro” aesthetic, Smart built a series of light fixtures and furniture utilizing copper, steel, and wood. The space showcases local artists and ongoing exhibitions.

Sheridan Veterans Memorial

In the spring of 2014, Smart installed a monumental work entitled Ethos for the Sheridan Veterans Memorial at the Sheridan Memorial Park in Sheridan, Minneapolis. This 35’ x 35’ x 35’ central sculpture is made of Corten steel shields and internally illuminated. The memorial is surrounded by gardens and vertical markers describing the ten conflicts in which Minnesotans have served. As the apex of these markers, Smart integrated cast iron faces of several veterans and family members. The project took over three years to complete with the strong support of the veterans’, local businesses and community members.

Al Nakhlah Tower 

In 2017, Smart worked with Charles R. Stinston Architects in Riyadh, Saudi Arabia to build two permanent stainless steel and cast glass sculptures suspended in a three-story lobby of the Al Nakhlah Tower in the King Abdullah Financial District.

Smart exhibited at the Art City Gallery in Ventura, California with 4 Sichuan artists and 14 California artists each having selected works in drawing, painting, and ceramics. The exhibition was held from May 19 through June 23, 2018. Smart has ongoing environmental site-specific installations in steel, light, and glass.

In 2019, Smart worked with the Hammel, Green and Abrahamson (HGA) Architects in Minneapolis on a 20’ x 10’ suspended steel sculpture for the Tri Faith Initiative Church in Omaha, Nebraska.

Gallery

Grants/Fellowships/Residencies, 2000-2021
Smart took residencies, programs or grants that provided him with housing, printing-studio facilities, and usually required a solo exhibition at the conclusion of the residency.

Selected Exhibitions

Permanent public art commissions

See also
 List of American artists 1900 and after
 Lighting control system
 Photonics

References

External links

 
 Robert Smart Art Installation "Cellular Photonics"
 Sheridan Veterans Memorial
 Science Digital Rendering Video
 Exclusive Behind The Scenes: the Kohler Arts Industry Program
 Sheridan Memorial Park
 Skokie Northshore Sculpture Park

1973 births
Sculptors from California
Artists from Wisconsin
20th-century American artists
21st-century American artists
Living people